World FC is a Belizean football team which currently competes in the Premier League of Belize.

The team is based in San Ignacio.  Their home stadium is Norman Broaster Stadium.

Current squad

External links
World FC

References

Football clubs in Belize